Cape Gloucester may refer to:
 Cape Gloucester, Queensland, a locality in the Whitsunday Region, Queensland, Australia
 Cape Gloucester (Papua New Guinea), a headland in Papua New Guinea